The Civic Archives in Bozen-Bolzano (German: Stadtarchiv Bozen; Italian: Archivio Storico della Città di Bolzano) are the municipal archive of the city of Bolzano in South Tyrol, Italy. They are located in the old town hall and store documents from over 700 years of civic and regional history.

History 

The records of the Civic Archives and their language reflect the complex and rich History of the Alps and especially the History of South Tyrol, being the oldest documentation from the late 13th century onwards written exclusively in Latin and German. Only from the annexation of the Southern Tyrol after World War I by Italy in 1919/20 onwards, the records are mainly kept in Italian.

The first mentions about the Bolzano records keeping are dating back to the late XV century. In 1472 the burgermeister Konrad Lerhueber instituted the so called Stadtbuch as the towns official register of legal acts.

In 1776 the civic council, on behalf of the burgermeister Franz von Gumer, decided to gather the municipal records within the old town hall and ordered the civic scrivener Johann Felix Gigl to collect the archives.

As in 1907 the municipality moved to Bolzano's new town hall, the historic documents were transferred to the Civic Museum and recorded by the Austrian historian and archivist Karl Klaar who made an inventory still valid today. In 2002 the whole documentation returned to the old town hall, in the meantime adapted as site of the historic archives.

Holdings 
Among the many documents preserved, of peculiar interest to the historic sciences are the archives of the former Hospital to the Holy Spirit (Heilig-Geist-Spital) existing from the late 13th to the 19th centuries. Also the archives of the former autonomous communities of Gries and Zwölfmalgreien (Dodiciville) are kept by the Civic Archives. The oldest document today existing is a fragment of Bede's Commentaries on Proverbs. There is also preserved an excerpt of the Middle High German Christherre-Chronik in a copy dating back to 14th century.

References

Sources

External links 
 BOhisto: Bozen-Bolzano's History Online
 Handschriftencensus Marburg-Mainz: Handschriftenbeschreibung 1895

Bolzano
Buildings and structures in Bolzano
Cultural heritage of Italy